Amathus Limassol was a Cypriot football club based in Limassol. The team played five times in Second Division. In September 1965, it merged with Apollon Limassol and kept the name Apollon.

References

Association football clubs disestablished in 1965
Defunct football clubs in Cyprus
1965 disestablishments in Cyprus